Castbox is a Hong Kong-based podcast company. The company both hosts and produces its own podcasts.

Founding
Castbox was founded in 2016 by company CEO Renee Wang in Beijing, China. It also has offices in San Francisco and Hong Kong.

App
Castbox is an app that distributes free podcasts. As of 2019, it has about one million podcasts available through it, including about fifty million podcast episodes. It also has a premium platform. In June 2019, Castbox integrated with Waze, allowing playback controls to pause, skip, or restart episodes.

Podcasts
In addition to its library of podcasts from other distributors, Castbox also produces its own shows. In 2018, Castbox partnered with Heard Well on the podcast series Heard Well Now, which highlights early career musical artists. , Castbox produced 25 different original podcasts, with This Sounds Serious being released in 2019.

Funding
In 2017, the company raised $16 million, and an additional $13.5 million in 2018.

References

Chinese companies established in 2016
Podcasting companies
Mass media companies of Hong Kong
Companies based in Beijing